Stevan Vladislav Kaćanski - "Stari Bard" (Srbobran, Habsburg Empire, 19 December 1828 - Belgrade, Kingdom of Serbia, 4 May 1890) was a popular Serbian poet of the second half of the 19th century at the most turbulent time in Europe during the Revolutions of 1848 in general and the Revolutions of 1848 in the Austrian Empire in particular Most of his poems were inspired by the poetic dream of Serbian liberation and unification. Today he is considered Serbia's national poet, who was one of the key figures of the 
Serb Revolution of 1848. He is best known as the author of Noćnica, which is said to have inspired the Serbs to seek independence from the Kingdom of Hungary though within the territories of the Austrian Empire.

Biography 
Stevan Vladislav Kaćanski was born into a respectable family, in Srbobran, in Bačka.  His parents were Trifon and Julijana, inhabitants of Srbobran. The family got its surname from the village of Kać, from where they moved at the end of the 18th century. Originally from Herzegovina, their last name was Vladisavljević, which is why Kaćanski always put it in front of his last name, or signed it only as Vladislav.

He finished primary school in Varadin and Srbobran, and started high school in Sremski Karlovci and finished in Szeged with the support from his uncle Sergije Kaćanski who later became bishop of the Eparchy of Gornji Karlovac, a very learned man and one of the most distinguished clerics there. Already in high school, Kaćanski began writing patriotic songs and became the president of the literary association of Serbs in the Szeged high school.

After high school, he enrolled at the Faculty of Philosophy in Pest, but left it very quickly and went on to study law at Jegra (Kingdom of Hungary). His studies were interrupted by the Serb Revolution of 1848-1849. Thanks to his determination and clarity, he quickly gained the trust of the national champions with his poems. With the help of uncle, the Serbian Orthodox bishop of Gornji Karlovac, Kaćanski was elected to the delegation, which in Zagreb negotiated with Josip Jelačić on a joint struggle against nationalist goals of the Hungarian Revolution of 1848. He took part in the defense of Srbobran, in the battles near Bačko Gradište and Sremski Karlovci. He became famous with the patriotic song "Noćnica".

Works
 Skupljene pesme (Collected Poems)
 Od Balkana do Adrije (From the Balkans to Adria)
 Grahov laz
 Narodni zbor
 Ljuba Nenadović (amanet sa neba)
 Kralj Nikola

References 

 translated and adapted from Riznica srpska: Stevan Vladislav Kaćanski (1829—1890)

1828 births
1890 deaths
People from Srbobran
People from Sremski Karlovci
People from Szeged
19th-century Serbian poets
Serbian revolutionaries
Austro-Hungarian rebels
Writers from Belgrade